Neil Smith (born April 10, 1966) is an American former professional football player who was a defensive end in the National Football League (NFL). He played for the Kansas City Chiefs from 1988 to 1996, the Denver Broncos from 1997 to 1999, and the San Diego Chargers in 2000. Before his NFL career, he played college football for the Nebraska Cornhuskers, where he was an All-American in 1987. He also co-owned an Arena Football team, the Kansas City Command.

Early years
Born in New Orleans, Smith graduated from McDonogh No. 35 Senior High School in the city.

Professional career

The Chiefs, who had the third pick, made it known to everyone before the 1988 NFL Draft that they intended to take Smith. The Detroit Lions, picking second, threatened to pick Smith and the Chiefs were forced to move up one slot to make sure that Smith would be their pick. Incidentally, one of the draft picks the Chiefs surrendered in order to move up turned out to be star linebacker Chris Spielman. Smith's pre-draft measurables were head-turning. He was 6'4½", weighed 260 pounds, had a 7-foot-1½-inch arm span, and ran a 4.55 forty-yard dash.

NFL career statistics

Legacy
One of the top defensive linemen of his era, Smith made the Pro Bowl 6 times during his career (1991–1995 and 1997), and led the NFL with 15 sacks in the 1993 season.  With the Broncos, Smith won 2 NFL championship rings for Super Bowl XXXII and Super Bowl XXXIII.  In the 1998 Divisional Playoffs against the Miami Dolphins, Smith cemented the 38-3 Broncos victory with a 79-yard fumble return for a touchdown, and in Super Bowl XXXII, he recorded a key fumble recovery that set up a Broncos field goal.

Smith finished his 13 NFL seasons with 104.5 sacks, 30 forced fumbles, 12 fumble recoveries, 19 return yards, and 1 touchdown.  He also intercepted 4 passes, returning them for 68 yards and a touchdown.  He is the former co-owner of the Kansas City Brigade of the Arena Football League.

On October 22, 2006, Smith was inducted to the Chiefs's Hall of Fame.

Notes
Smith's trademark sack celebration, which consisted of him pantomiming swinging a baseball bat, was invented in tribute to another Kansas City sports hero, Hall Of Famer George Brett.

There was a rule created in his name. The "Neil Smith" rule, enacted in 1998, prevents a defensive lineman from flinching to induce a false start penalty on the offense.

Neil Smith was a Co-Owner of the Kansas City Brigade, a team in the Arena Football League from 2006 until 2008.

Smith appeared as a panelist on the Nickelodeon game show Figure it Out. He also appeared in a series of Campbell's Chunky Soup commercials.

The Kansas City Command retired #90 in his honor.

References

External links
Stats from ESPN.com
NFL biography, 1988-1998 (archived)

1966 births
Living people
Players of American football from New Orleans
American football defensive ends
Nebraska Cornhuskers football players
Kansas City Chiefs players
Denver Broncos players
San Diego Chargers players
American Conference Pro Bowl players
Arena Football League executives
African-American sports executives and administrators
American sports executives and administrators
21st-century African-American people
20th-century African-American sportspeople
100 Sacks Club
Ed Block Courage Award recipients